Frankfurt (Main) Mühlberg station is an underground Rhine-Main S-Bahn station on the  Frankfurt City Tunnel in the Frankfurt district of Sachsenhausen in the German state of Hesse. The station is classified by Deutsche Bahn as a category 4 station. It was opened with the eastern part of the City Tunnel (which is called the Frankfurt–Mühlberg tunnel), which was opened in 1992 as the last section of the City Tunnel. It consists of two tracks on either side of an island platform.

The escalators down to the platform are located on Offenbacher Landstraße.

Services
The station is served by S-Bahn lines S1, S2, S8, and S9.

Above the S-Bahn station is the Mühlberg station on lines 15 and 16 of the Frankfurt tram network. This station is also served by Frankfurt city bus route 46, and night bus routes n62 and n63.

References

Rhine-Main S-Bahn stations
Railway stations in Germany opened in 1992
Railway stations located underground in Frankfurt